Ava Town Hall is a historic town hall building located at Ava in Oneida County, New York. It was built in 1897 and is a two-story, balloon frame structure with a "T" shaped floor plan, stone foundation, and intersecting gable roofs.  Also on the property is a small frame privy.

It was listed on the National Register of Historic Places in 1992.

References

City and town halls on the National Register of Historic Places in New York (state)
Government buildings completed in 1897
Buildings and structures in Oneida County, New York
National Register of Historic Places in Oneida County, New York